Živa Falkner (born 7 July 2002) is a Slovenian tennis player.

Falkner has a career high WTA ranking of 479 in singles achieved on 13 December 2021. She also has a career high WTA ranking of 414 in doubles achieved on 19 September 2022.

Falkner made her WTA main-draw debut at the 2021 Zavarovalnica Sava Portorož after receiving a wildcard for the singles and doubles main draws.

ITF Circuit finals

Singles: 3 (1 title, 2 runner–ups)

Junior Grand Slam finals

Girls' doubles

References

External links
 
 

2002 births
Living people
Slovenian female tennis players